Mayville High School  is an independent co-educational day school in Southsea, Portsmouth, England.

History
Mayville High School was founded in the home of Lottie West at 1 Gains Road in Portsmouth. The school moved to a number of different locations before settling in its current premises. Between 1911 and 1936 the school accepted boarding pupils, but they were later transferred to Charmandean Manor School in Worthing, West Sussex. In September 1936, it was reopened as a day school. During the Second World War, when Portsmouth was heavily damaged during German bombings, Mayville was one of the few schools which were not evacuated. In 1980 Mayville became a charitable trust. Boys were formally admitted during the 1990s, though there had already been a small number attending since the end of the War. The school is now co-educational, though boys and girls are taught separately in core curriculum subjects.

Academics
Mayville caters to children aged 2 to 16. Junior School pupils are generally given automatic entry into the Senior School, while new applicants must pass a test and an interview. The school caters for pupils of all abilities and there are specialized "units" to attend to ‘gifted and talented’ children and those with learning disabilities.

In August 2017, 95% of Mayville High School pupils obtained five A* to C grades, including the core subjects of Mathematics and English.

Early years
The Early Years Foundation Stage at Mayville is divided into 3 areas:

Nursery
The nursery at Mayville is housed on the Kenilworth premises with the Pre-Prep and Junior department.

All children in the Foundation Stage are taught Music, PE, and French from teachers in the school. Children can play outside and explore a garden area. Mayville runs trips on foot or by minibus.

Lower 1
Lower 1 is Mayville High School's reception class, and is deemed the first proper year of school. Starting with Lower 1, pupils are expected to wear uniforms and participate in whole-school events.

Boys and girls are taught separately for most of the curriculum, with learning styles adapted to both sides, but regularly join together for activities centred on independent learning.

Pre-Prep and Junior School
Teachers in this part of the school are specialists in topics including English, mathematics, science, history, geography, religious education, art, IT, music, physical education, drama, and foreign languages.

Wrap-Around Care
Mayville offers a breakfast and after-school club for 50 weeks of each year with nursery staff. Staff plan activities and trips based on children's interests.

Senior School
In the Senior School, pupils also take CAT tests which are used throughout the school as baseline testing.

Dyslexia
Mayville is known for its expertise in the specialist tuition of dyslexic pupils. The school runs the ‘Harden-Davies Dyslexia Unit’, catering for dyslexia, dyscalculia, dyspraxia, and mild speech and language disorders. Children aged 4 to 16 can receive an individual program of support to help overcome their particular difficulties.

The Harden-Davies Dyslexia Unit is regularly inspected by CreSTeD, most recently in February 2020, when the Dyslexia Unit status was last renewed.

Performing Arts 
Mayville High School runs dedicated departments for Drama, Music, and Dance, and has facilities on the school premises for rehearsals and performances. Pupils can take one-to-one classes with singing, acting, and public speaking mentors, and have the opportunity to work collaboratively within Mayville's orchestra, choir, or band. Every year, Mayville pupils can participate in Rock Challenge.

The school launched their Mayville Academy of Performing Arts (abbreviated to MAPA) in April 2018. The academy offers courses in Dance, Singing, Drama and Technical Theatre, all of which conclude in stage performances for parents in the school's theatre studios, or for the wider public at nearby venues like The Kings Theatre and Portsmouth Guildhall.

A number of Mayville High School pupils have gained LAMDA qualifications, and performed at a professional level in West End productions.

Sports 
Mayville's sports facilities encompass athletics, badminton, cricket, football, gymnastics, netball, rounders, rugby, swimming, tennis, trampolining, and volleyball. These facilities include a 20-acre field in Southsea, where the school's rugby, football, and cricket teams practice and play.

Internal sporting competitions take place between Mayville's three houses: ‘Austen’, ‘Cavell’, and ‘Nelson’. Mayville also competes with other schools on both a local and county-wide level.

The Mayville Sports Academy offers extra-curricular opportunities to pupils who want to improve their fitness, skills, and teamwork. The academy runs a number of summer courses.

Catchment area and transport
Mayville High School's catchment area is typically wide. A fleet of minibuses pick up pupils from Horndean, Portsmouth Harbour railway station, the Gosport Ferry, and the Hovercraft. Pupils living outside Portsmouth can use Lucketts' Student City Link coaches. Mayville has pupils who travel back and forth from the Isle of Wight each day.

Staff
Mayville uses general classroom teachers in the junior school and specialist teachers in the senior school, as is common practice in the United Kingdom. Alongside teachers, the school employs a range of support staff.

References

External links
Mayville High School website
Profile on the ISC website

Educational institutions established in 1897
Private schools in Portsmouth
Secondary schools in Portsmouth
1897 establishments in England
Member schools of the Independent Schools Association (UK)